The 2015–16 UEFA Women's Champions League knockout phase began on 7 October 2015 and concluded on 26 May 2016 with the final at Mapei Stadium – Città del Tricolore in Reggio Emilia, Italy, which decided the champions of the 2015–16 UEFA Women's Champions League. A total of 32 teams competed in the knockout phase.

Times from 25 October 2015 up to 26 March 2016 (round of 16 and quarter-finals first legs) were CET (UTC+1), all other times were CEST (UTC+2).

Round and draw dates
The schedule of the competition was as follows (all draws were held at the UEFA headquarters in Nyon, Switzerland).

Format
The knockout phase involved 32 teams: 24 teams which qualified directly, and the eight group winners from the qualifying round.

Each tie in the knockout phase, apart from the final, was played over two legs, with each team playing one leg at home. The team that scored more goals on aggregate over the two legs advanced to the next round. If the aggregate score was level, the away goals rule was applied, i.e. the team that scored more goals away from home over the two legs advanced. If away goals were also equal, then 30 minutes of extra time was played. The away goals rule was again applied after extra time, i.e. if there were goals scored during extra time and the aggregate score was still level, the visiting team advanced by virtue of more away goals scored. If no goals were scored during extra time, the tie was decided by penalty shoot-out. In the final, which was played as a single match, if scores were level at the end of normal time, extra time was played, followed by penalty shoot-out if scores remained tied.

The mechanism of the draws for each round was as follows:
In the draw for the round of 32, the sixteen teams with the highest UEFA coefficients were seeded (with the title holders being the automatic top seed), and the other sixteen teams were unseeded. The seeded teams were drawn against the unseeded teams, with the seeded teams hosting the second leg. Teams from the same association could not be drawn against each other.
In the draw for the round of 16, the eight teams with the highest UEFA coefficients were seeded (with the title holders being the automatic top seed should they qualify), and the other eight teams were unseeded. The seeded teams were drawn against the unseeded teams, with the seeded teams hosting the second leg. Teams from the same association could not be drawn against each other.
In the draws for the quarter-finals onwards, there were no seedings, and teams from the same association could be drawn against each other.

Qualified teams
Below are the 32 teams which participated in the knockout phase (with their 2015 UEFA club coefficients, which took into account their performance in European competitions from 2010–11 to 2014–15 plus 33% of their association coefficient from the same time span).

Bracket

Round of 32
The draw for the round of 32 was held on 20 August 2015.

Notes

The first legs were played on 7 and 8 October, and the second legs were played on 14 and 15 October 2015.

|}

Barcelona won 5–2 on aggregate.

Lyon won 9–0 on aggregate.

Paris Saint-Germain won 15–0 on aggregate.

Slavia Praha won 4–2 on aggregate.

Frankfurt won 8–0 on aggregate.

KIF Örebro won 8–0 on aggregate.

3–3 on aggregate. Twente won on away goals.

Atlético Madrid won 3–2 on aggregate.

AGSM Verona won 7–6 on aggregate.

Zvezda Perm won 6–2 on aggregate.

Lillestrøm SK won 2–1 on aggregate.

Chelsea won 4–0 on aggregate.

Rosengård SK won 9–0 on aggregate.

Fortuna Hjørring won 6–0 on aggregate.

Wolfsburg won 4–0 on aggregate.

Brescia won 2–0 on aggregate.

Round of 16
The draw for the round of 16 was held on 19 October 2015.

The first legs were played on 11 and 12 November, and the second legs were played on 18 and 19 November 2015.

|}

Barcelona won 2–0 on aggregate.

Brescia won 2–1 on aggregate.

Lyon won 9–1 on aggregate.

Slavia Praha won 2–1 on aggregate.

Wolfsburg won 4–1 on aggregate.

1–1 on aggregate. Paris Saint-Germain won on away goals.

Rosengård won 8–2 on aggregate.

2–2 on aggregate. Frankfurt won 5–4 on penalties.

Quarter-finals
The draws for the quarter-finals and semi-finals were held on 27 November 2015. The first legs were played on 23 March, and the second legs were played on 30 March 2016.

|}

Wolfsburg won 6–0 on aggregate.

1–1 on aggregate. Frankfurt won 5–4 on penalties.

Lyon won 9–1 on aggregate.

Paris Saint-Germain won 1–0 on aggregate.

Semi-finals
The first legs were played on 24 April, and the second legs were played on 1 and 2 May 2016.

|}

Lyon won 8–0 on aggregate.

Wolfsburg won 4–1 on aggregate.

Final

The final was played on 26 May 2016 at the Mapei Stadium – Città del Tricolore in Reggio Emilia, Italy.

References

External links
2015–16 UEFA Women's Champions League

2